Clarkeulia medanosa is a species of moth of the family Tortricidae. It is found in Argentina.

The wingspan is 17–19 mm. The ground colour of the proximal half of the forewings is cream, slightly suffused with brownish ochreous costally. The posterior half is ochreous brownish, tinged with orange costally. The hindwings are pale brownish and cream at the base.

Etymology
The species name refers to the name of the type locality, Salta Los Medanos.

References

Moths described in 2007
Clarkeulia
Moths of South America
Taxa named by Józef Razowski